The 2014 Royal Lahaina Challenger was a professional tennis tournament played on hard courts. It was the fifth edition of the tournament which was part of the 2014 ATP Challenger Tour. It took place in Maui, United States between 20 and 26 January 2014.

Singles main-draw entrants

Seeds

 1 Rankings are as of January 13, 2014.

Other entrants
The following players received wildcards into the singles main draw:
  Thibaud Berland
  Petr Michnev
  Marcos Giron
  Mitchell Krueger

The following players received entry from the qualifying draw:
  Jared Donaldson
  Malek Jaziri
  Daniel Kosakowski
  Wang Chieh-Fu

The following players received entry as a lucky loser:
  Jarmere Jenkins
  Kento Takeuchi

Champions

Singles

 Bradley Klahn def.  Yang Tsung-hua, 6–2, 6–3

Doubles

 Denis Kudla /  Yasutaka Uchiyama def.  Daniel Kosakowski /  Nicolas Meister, 6–3, 6–2

External links
Official Website

Royal Lahaina Challenger
ATP Challengers in Hawaii
Royal Lahaina Challenger
Royal Lahaina Challenger
Royal Lahaina Challenger